Toine van Peperstraten (born 18 December 1967 in Achthuizen, South Holland) is a Dutch sports journalist, best known for hosting the NOS TV sports program Studio Sport.

Career 
Being a celebrity, he also participated in the 2006 edition of Wie is... de Mol?, the series' second celebrity edition.
Since February 2019, Van Peperstraten is the presenter of the NPO Radio 2 program 't Get Nu Laat from WNL and thus returned to NPO Radio 2. And since 2020 he also presents the program Stax&Toine with Dionne Stax on NPO Radio 1 from Monday to Thursday. Since March 2021, he has been presenting the program with Mischa Blok and it is called Blok&Toine.

In 2022, he appeared in the television show The Masked Singer.

Humanitarian work 
Toine is Ambassador for the Eye Care Foundation and Parasports.

References

External links 

1967 births
Living people
Dutch journalists
Dutch television presenters
Dutch sports journalists
Dutch association football commentators
People from Oostflakkee
20th-century Dutch people
21st-century Dutch people